Ukrainian Rhapsody is a 1961 Soviet drama film directed by Sergei Parajanov.

Plot 
The film takes place during the war. In the center of the plot is a guy named Anton, who is captured. He manages to escape and hide in the house of an organist. American troops are entering the city, and Anton cannot leave the city because of the ban. His beloved Oksana from the Ukrainian village is still waiting for him.

Cast 
 Olga Reus-Petrenko as Oksana Marchenko
 Yevgenia Miroshnichenko as Oksana Marchenko (singing voice)
 Eduard Koshman as Anton Petrenko
 Yuriy Gulyayev as Vadim
 Natalya Uzhviy as Nadyezhda Petrovna
 Aleksandr Gai as Vayner
 Valeriy Vitter as Rudi
 Stepan Shkurat as Grandfather
 Sergey Petrov as Jury chairman (as S. Petrov)

References

External links 
 

1961 films
1960s Russian-language films
Soviet drama films
1961 drama films